Isoxerocomic acid is a red-orange pigment found in Boletales. It is the precursor to variegatic acid, and is preceded by atromentic acid and atromentin. As an example, it is isolated from Serpula lacrymans. It is soluble in methanol. It is the isomer of xerocomic acid and precursor to xerocomorubin.

References

Catechols
Furanones
3-Hydroxypropenals